Ivo Nesrovnal, LL.M. (born 19 May 1964, Bratislava) is a Slovak lawyer, politician. He served as the Mayor of Bratislava from 2014 to 2018.

Mayor of Bratislava

2014 candidacy 
Nesrovnal left SDKÚ-DS party in August 2014 and decided to run for Bratislava mayor. He received 50630 votes (39.3%), about 10000 more than then-mayor Milan Ftáčnik (31.4%).

2018 candidacy 
Nesrovnal ran for the post again in the 2018 municipal elections as an independent candidate, and, having received 18.4% of the votes and the third place, was defeated by Matúš Vallo, who received 36.5% of the votes.

References

External links 
 Ivo Nesrovnal's blog
 Ivo Nesrovnal's Facebook page

Comenius University alumni
1964 births
Living people
Mayors of Bratislava